Project: Destiny is a Big Finish Productions audio drama based on the long-running British science fiction television series Doctor Who. It is a sequel to Project: Twilight and Project: Lazarus.

Plot
Hex is brought home after being shot, but the rest of London has been evacuated due to a disfiguring alien contagion.

Cast
Seventh Doctor – Sylvester McCoy
Ace – Sophie Aldred
Hex – Philip Olivier
Sir William Abberton (Nimrod) – Stephen Chance
Captain Lysandra Aristedes – Maggie O'Neill
Sergeant Jarrod – Philip Dinsdale
Helen/Oracle – Ingrid Oliver

External links
Big Finish Productions – Project: Destiny

2010 audio plays
Seventh Doctor audio plays
Fiction set in 2026